Annalu Waller  is Professor of Computer Science at the University of Dundee and leads the Augmentative and Alternate Communication (AAC) Research Group at the university.

Career
Waller was appointed an OBE in the 2016 New Year Honours for  services to people with Complex Communication Needs. In September 2017 she was awarded an honorary fellowship of the Royal College of Speech and Language Therapists for her work on AAC. She received the honour from the RCSLT's patron, the Countess of Wessex. She is a trustee of Capability Scotland.

Waller is an ordained priest and is the honorary Chaplain of the Dundee University Anglican Chaplaincy.

References

Living people
Year of birth missing (living people)
Fellows of the Royal College of Speech and Language Therapists
Members of the Order of the British Empire
British chaplains
Academics of the University of Dundee